Marissa Irvin and Alexandra Stevenson were the defending champions, but they did not compete this year.

Kim Clijsters and Eva Dyrberg won the title without losing a set, defeating Australians Jelena Dokić and Evie Dominikovic in the final.

Draw

Finals

Top half

Bottom half

References
Main Draw

Girls' Doubles
US Open, 1998 Girls' Doubles